Survivor: Cook Islands is the thirteenth season of the American competitive reality television series, Survivor. The season was filmed from June 26 to August 3, 2006, and premiered on September 14 of that year. Filmed in the Cook Islands, it was broadcast by CBS.

The season had 20 contestants who were initially divided into four "tribes" by ethnicity: African American, Asian American, Hispanic American, and Caucasian. The tribes were named after some of the Cook Islands: Manihiki, Puka Puka, Aitutaki, and Rarotonga. They were later merged into a single tribe, Aitutonga. The season was the first with a final consisting of three participants, rather than two. Yul Kwon defeated Ozzy Lusth and Becky Lee by a jury vote of 5–4–0 and was named the Sole Survivor, winning $1,000,000.

Overview

Survivor is a reality television show based on the Swedish show Expedition Robinson, created by Mark Burnett and Charlie Parsons. The series follows a number of participants isolated in a remote location, where they must provide food, fire, and shelter. One participant is removed from the series by majority vote every three days, with challenges held to give a reward (ranging from living- and food-related prizes to a car) and immunity from being voted out of the series. The last remaining player receives a prize of $1,000,000. Pre-production began in spring 2006, and principal photography lasted from July 3 to August 11, 2006.

Filming locations

The tribal camps, Exile Island, and many of Survivor: Cook Islands challenges were filmed on motu (islets) in the Aituaki lagoon. The Rarotonga (later Aitutonga) tribe's camp was on Moturakau, and the Aitutaki tribe lived on Motukitiu. The short-lived tribes of Manihiki and Puka Puka lived on Rapota and Muritapua, respectively. Most challenges were filmed on Tekopua and Tapuaetai (One Foot Island). Exile Island is a small sand cay south of Tapuaetai, and the bow of the wooden ship was brought in for the show. West of Tapuaetai is another sand cay, called "Nude Island" by locals because of its lack of vegetation. The third challenge was staged in the shallow water just off the shore of Nude Island. Akaiami hosted challenges and "The Ponderosa," where eliminated contestants remained until the end of the game. The Tribal Council, the production camp, and a few challenges were located on the main island of Aitutaki. There were three reward trips to the neighboring islands of Atiu, Mitiaro, and Rarotonga. Taio Shipping diverted the MV Maungaroa from its usual schedule to a charter for the producers of Survivor: Cook Islands in June 2006, triggering fuel and electricity crises on the island of Mangaia.

Contestants
The tribes were named after the islands of the Cook Islands: Manihiki, Puka Puka, Aitutaki, and Rarotonga. They were later merged into a single tribe, Aitutonga.

Notable people on this cast include professional volleyball player J.P. Calderon, and actor, producer, and screenwriter, Jonathan Penner.

Future appearances
Jonathan Penner, Ozzy Lusth, and Parvati Shallow were selected to compete again in Survivor: Micronesia. Shallow returned for Survivor: Heroes vs. Villains with Candice Woodcock. Lusth returned for a third time in Survivor: South Pacific and for a fourth time in Survivor: Game Changers. Penner returned for his third time in Survivor: Philippines. Woodcock (now using her husband's surname, Cody) returned for her third time in Survivor: Blood vs. Water with her husband, John. Shallow and Yul Kwon returned to compete on Survivor: Winners at War.

Outside of Survivor, J. P. Calderon became a cast member in the Oxygen reality series The Janice Dickinson Modeling Agency as one of the models. Lusth competed on the second season of American Ninja Warrior. Kwon was a contestant on the USA Network reality competition series, Snake in the Grass.

Season summary
The 20 participants, divided into four tribes (based on race) for the first six days of the competition, were then merged into two tribes. An early visit to Exile island resulted in Yul discovering the hidden immunity idol. With the tribes equal at six members each on Day 19, the castaways were given the choice to mutiny and join the other tribe; Candice and Jonathan opted to do so, leaving the Aitutaki tribe at four members (Yul, Ozzy, Becky, and Sundra) against the eight-member Rarotonga tribe. With teamwork, Yul's intelligence and Ozzy's swimming skills, Aitutaki defeated Rarotonga at every subsequent challenge and left Rarotonga with only five members at the merge.

While the Aitu Four merged, Yul cemented his Aitutaki alliance by showing them the idol and convinced Jonathan to vote with them. The Aitu Four took control of the game, and were the final four players remaining. With Yul holding the hidden immunity idol and Ozzy winning the final challenge, the four agreed to let a fire-making challenge decide who would join them at the final tribal council; it took over an hour to complete, with Becky victorious. The jury, seeing Becky following Yul and her poor performance in the fire-making challenge, did not vote for her; Yul's brains edged out Ozzy's brawn, five votes to four.

{| class="wikitable" style="margin:auto; text-align:center"
|+Challenge winners and eliminations by episode
! scope="col" colspan="3"|Episode
! scope="col" colspan="2"|Challenge winner(s)
! scope="col" rowspan="2"|ExileIsland
! colspan="2" |Eliminated
|-
! scope="col"|No.
! scope="col"|Title
! scope="col"|Original air date
! scope="col"|Reward
! scope="col"|Immunity
! scope="col"|Tribe
! scope="col"|Player
|-
! rowspan="3"|1
| style="text-align:left;" rowspan="3"|"I Can Forgive Her But I Don't Have ToBecause She Screwed With My Chickens"
| nowrap style="text-align:left;"  rowspan="3"|September 14, 2006
| colspan="2" 
| rowspan="3" 
| rowspan="3" 
| rowspan="3" | Sekou
|-
| colspan="2" 
|-
| colspan="2" 
|-
! rowspan="3"|2
| style="text-align:left;" rowspan="3"|"Dire Strengths and Dead Weight"
|nowrap style="text-align:left;"  rowspan="3"|September 21, 2006
| colspan="2" 
| rowspan="3" 
| rowspan="3" 
| rowspan="3" | Billy
|-
| colspan="2" 
|-
| style="text-align:center; background:darkgrey;"|
|
|-
!3
|align="left"|"Flirting and Frustration"
|align="left"|September 28, 2006
|
|
|
|
|Cecilia
|-
!4
|align="left"|"Ruling the Roost"
|align="left"|October 5, 2006
|
|
|
|
|J.P.
|-
!5
|align="left"|"Don't Cry Over Spilled Octopus"
|align="left"|October 12, 2006
|
|
|
|
|Stephannie
|-
! rowspan="2"|6
| style="text-align:left;" rowspan="2"|"Plan Voodoo"
| rowspan="2" style="text-align:left;"|October 19, 2006
| 
| style="text-align:center; background:darkgrey;"|
| rowspan="2" |
|Cao Boi
|-
| colspan="2" | Nate
|
|Cristina
|-
!7
|align="left"|"A Closer Look"
|align="left"|October 26, 2006
| colspan="5" |Recap Episode|-
!8
|align="left"|"Why Aren't You Swimming?!"
|align="left"|November 2, 2006
|
|
|
|
|Jessica
|-
!9
|align="left"|"Mutiny"
|align="left"|November 9, 2006
|
|
|
|
|Brad
|-
! rowspan="2" |10
| rowspan="2" style="text-align:left;" |""People That You Like Want To See You Suffer"
| rowspan="2" style="text-align:left;" |November 16, 2006
| rowspan="2" 
| rowspan="2" 
| rowspan="2" 
|
|Rebecca
|-
|
|Jenny
|-
!11
| align="left" |"Why Would You Trust Me?"
| align="left" |November 23, 2006
| 
| Ozzy
| 
| rowspan="6" 
|Nate
|-
!12
| align="left" |"You're a Rat..."
| align="left" |November 30, 2006
| 
|Adam
|Candice
|Candice
|-
!13
| align="left" |"Arranging a Hit"
| align="left" |December 7, 2006
|Parvati[Adam, Sundra]
|Ozzy
|Jonathan
|Jonathan
|-
!14
| align="left" |"I Have the Advantage...For Once"
| align="left" |December 14, 2006
|Ozzy,Parvati, Yul
|Ozzy
|Adam
|Parvati
|-
! rowspan="2" |15
| rowspan="2" style="text-align:left;" |"This Tribe Will Self-Destruct in 5, 4, 3..."
| rowspan="3" style="text-align:left;" |December 17, 2006
| rowspan="2" 
| Ozzy
| rowspan="2" 
|Adam
|-
| Ozzy
|Sundra
|-
!16
| style="text-align:left;" |"Reunion"
| colspan="5" bgcolor="darkgray" |
|}In the case of multiple tribes or castaways who win reward or immunity, they are listed in order of finish, or alphabetically where it was a team effort; where one castaway won and invited others, the invitees are in brackets.Episodes

Voting history

ReceptionSurvivor: Cook Islands received mixed reviews when it was first broadcast, but has become more popular over time. Although the racial cast divide was seen as polarizing, Kwon, Lusth and Penner were praised. Dalton Ross of Entertainment Weekly ranked the season 18th out of 40, calling it "listless" until the mutiny. In 2014, Joe Reid of The Wire ranked the season fifth out of 27. A Rob Has a Podcast poll the following year ranked the season 14th out of 30, with Rob Cesternino ranking it 24th. Cesternino's 2021 Survivor All-Time Top 40 Rankings podcast ranked the season 19th out of 40. The Purple Rock Podcast ranked this season seventh out of 40 in 2020, saying that it "features one of the more compelling narratives the show has ever had, and gives you the rare opportunity to see in-depth strategy talk between players." Later that year, Inside Survivor ranked the season 18th out of 40 and praised it for "having one of the best underdog stories of all time." In 2021, Kristen Kranz of Collider ranked Cook Islands as the 7th best season of the series and praised the diversity of the contestants, the "phenomenal" gameplay, as well as the introduction of "another group of influential players that would go on to shape the game in ways we couldn’t imagine." In the 2015 issue of CBS Watch commemorating the 15th anniversary of Survivor, three of the top ten contestants voted by viewers as the greatest were in this season (Shallow, Lusth, and Kwon).

Kwon's gameplay had a positive reception. In the 2015 issue of CBS Watch commemorating the 15th anniversary of Survivor, he was ranked the ninth-greatest contestant in series history by viewers. That year, shortly before the premiere of Survivor: Worlds Apart, host Jeff Probst called Kwon one of his top ten winners and one of his top six male winners. A 2007 online readers' poll by Entertainment Weekly chose Kwon its favorite Survivor winner. In 2017, the magazine had fans rank the 34 winners of Survivor; Kwon was ranked ninth.

The decision to divide the teams by race and ethnicity was controversial before the season aired, with members of the New York City Council's Black, Latino and Asian Caucus asking CBS not to broadcast the show. Those who worked on the show said that as divisions by age, gender, or gender and age combined had been accepted, race should not have been treated much differently. Probst conceded a slight difference, in that racial segregation was part of US history. Previous seasons have been criticized for their relative lack of diversity, with Probst saying that over 80 percent of Survivor's applicants were white.

According to Advertising Age magazine, more than a half-dozen major advertisers (including General Motors and Coca-Cola) withdrew their sponsorship after hearing about the teams' division. According to a New York Times report, the decision by several advertisers (also including the Home Depot, United Parcel Service, and Campbell Soup) not to sponsor the season was made three months before its start and was unrelated to its racial format.Mad TV parodied Cook Islands'' in its twelfth-season premiere episode, which aired on September 16, 2006. The parody gave the white challengers significantly-easier tasks; a swimming challenge allowed the whites to use a canoe. A white fire-building kit consisted of gasoline and a DVD on how to make a fire; the Hispanic contestants received flint, the Asians received a matchstick, and the African-Americans received a glass of water.

References

External links
 Official CBS Survivor Cook Islands Website

13
2006 in the Cook Islands
2006 American television seasons
Television shows set in the Cook Islands
Television shows filmed in the Cook Islands